Murder, Mystery and My Family is a BBC One series featuring Sasha Wass KC and Jeremy Dein KC., which examines historic criminal convictions resulting in the death penalty in order to determine if any of them resulted in a miscarriage of justice. Their submissions – Dein for the "defence" and Wass for the "prosecution" – are then presented to Judge David Radford, who considers whether there are grounds to consider the convictions as being unsafe. Cases featured include those of Edward Devlin and Alfred Burns, John Dickman, Edith Thompson and Frederick Bywaters, and Herbert John Bennett. In 2019, it won Best Daytime Programme of the Broadcast Awards.

Episode guide

Series 1 (2018)

Series 2 (2019)

Series 3 (2019)

Series 4 (2020)

Series 5 (2021)

Murder, Mystery and My Family: Case Closed?

In April 2019, five 45-minute episodes of the follow-up series Murder, Mystery and My Family: Case Closed? were broadcast on BBC One, revisiting cases previously covered in series 1 of the main programme.
In August 2020, a second series of five 45-minute episodes was broadcast on BBC One, revisiting cases previously covered in series 2 and 3 of the main programme.

Series 1 (2019)

Series 2 (2020)

Series 3 (2021)

Series 4 (2021)

See also

Second Verdict
Julian Fellowes Investigates: A Most Mysterious Murder
History of English criminal law

References

Bibliography

External links
 

2018 British television series debuts
2010s British crime television series
2020s British crime television series
2010s British legal television series
2020s British legal television series
Documentary television series about crime
English-language television shows
Court shows
BBC television documentaries about history during the 18th and 19th centuries
BBC television documentaries about history during the 20th Century